Al-Khelaifi or Al-Khulaifi (: "my successor"); is an Arabic language surname which in both of its Latin transcriptions (Khelaifi and Khulaifi) of the Perso-Arabic alphabet is also common among the Arab diaspora. Notable people with the surname include:

Al-Khulaifi
 Mohamed Bin Mubarak Al-Khulaifi (born 1999), Qatari swimmer
 Noah Al-Khulaifi (born 1946), Qatari diplomat
 Sultan Khlaifa al-Khulaifi, Qatari blogger, human rights activist
 Yacob Al-Khulaifi (born 2001), Qatari swimmer

Al-Khelaifi
 Aisha Al-Khelaifi, Qatari chess player
 Fatima Al-Khelaifi, Qatari researcher
 Kholoud Al-Khelaifi, Qatari chess player
 Nasser Al-Khelaifi (born 1973), Qatari businessman and sports executive
 Salama Al-Khelaifi, Qatari chess player

Arabic-language surnames
Surnames of Qatari origin